Astacosia is a genus of moths in the subfamily Arctiinae. The genus was erected by Hervé de Toulgoët in 1958.

Species
Astacosia lineata Toulgoët, 1966
Astacosia oblonga (Toulgoët, 1955)
Astacosia ornatrix Toulgoët, 1958

References

Lithosiini
Moth genera